Luv U Alia is a 2016 Indian Kannada-language romance drama film written and directed by director Indrajit Lankesh and starring V. Ravichandran, Bhumika Chawla, Chandan Kumar and Nikesha Patel and Sangeeta Chauhan. The film was originally supposed to be additionally shot in Hindi; however, the Hindi version was dropped in favor of a dubbed release. The film was released on 17 September 2015. The Hindi dubbed version was released on 17 June 2016. Luv U Alia is produced by Sammy's Magic Cinema. The cinematography was performed by Santosh Rai Pathaje and the film was edited by Suresh D. H. The soundtrack was composed by Jassie Gift, who collaborated with J. J. Vallisa to score the background music. The production was launched on 26 October 2014.

Plot 
Alia is a young shy college girl. She has never known any more fun than reading and fixing her glasses up her nose. Life takes a sudden turn after an evening spent in an accidentally locked car under a rainy night with Arhaan, the college Casanova. Will their love-hate relationship take a turn for the better after sharing their darkest secrets with each other?

Cast 

 V. Ravichandran as Dr. Ravi
 Bhumika Chawla as Bhoomi
 Chandan Kumar as Kiran
 Sangeeta Chauhan as Alia
 P. Ravi Shankar as Zulfi
 Sayaji Shinde
 Sadhu Kokila
 Sudharani
 Shakeela
 Bhavya
 Aditi Acharya
 Prashanth Siddi
 Bullet Prakash
 Sudeepa in a cameo appearance
 Dhyan in a cameo appearance as Suman
 Nikesha Patel in a cameo appearance
 Srujan Lokesh in a cameo appearance
 Indrajit Lankesh in a cameo appearance
 Sunny Leone in an item number "Kamakshi"

Soundtrack

J. J. Vallisa scored the film's background music and the soundtrack was composed by Jassie Gift, lyrics for which was penned Kaviraj. The soundtrack album consists of five tracks. The track "Kuntre Nintre", a remixed version of a track of the same name from the 1985 film Trishula, was included in the album. Poet Siddalingaiah had written the lyrics for the track, and the remixed version featured additional lyrics by Kaviraj. The album was released on 15 June 2015 in the studios of the sketch comedy show, Majaa Talkies in Bangalore, as part of the film's promotions.

Critical reception
ytalkies.com reviewed the soundtrack album and called it an "average album" with "not a not a single melody song". The reviewer felt the track "Sanjeveleli", a "solo romantic number in the voice of Javed Ali [gave] a pleasant opening to the album". He called the other tracks " too loud" or that it lacked "quality lyrics". The New Indian Express in its review wrote that the music "add[ed] texture" to the film "through songs" with "Jessie's tactful music and Kaviraj's lyrics". The reviewer felt, "the song 'Sanje velali' adds to the charm of the film."

Release and reception

Writing for The New Indian Express, A. Sharadhaa wrote, "A contemporary family drama, Luv U Alia does not come across as a mishmash of characters, but has a streamlined narration that takes you through the nuances of love, marriage and divorce." She added, "Indrajit has created situational set pieces that do justice to the  ensemble star cast and backdrops... Cinematographer Santhosh Rai Pathaje has followed Indrajit's narrative perfectly. Even Ravi Shankar comes across as a cool antagonist and brings out the lighter side of his character." and further wrote, "While senior actors like Ravichandran and Bhoomika seem quite comfortable with their roles, it is the young Chandan who makes the most out of this romantic family drama." Reviewing the film for The Hindu, Archana Nathan calling the film "flamboyant but vacuous", wrote, "With every frame, Indrajit constructs a specific kind of spectacle — an upper class, glossy one full of revving bikes, exotic locations and five star hotels. However, there is very little strength in the script of the film to carry these grand frames successfully until the end." Shyam Prasad S. of Bangalore Mirror rated the film three out of five, and wrote, "Luv U Alia is a visual extravaganza; colourful with eye candy" and added, "The first half of the film is a comedy shouldered by Ravishankar as a bumbling don. It is in the second half that the real story between Ravichandran and Bhoomika opens up. But here the comedy of Sadhu Kokila and Shakeela is a drag and the film would have done without it and made the second half a lot crispier."

S. Viswanath of Deccan Herald also rated the film 3/5 and wrote, "Lankesh highlights how personal egos and overt professional pursuits drive otherwise perfect couples to divorce, the marital discord having an impact on the children of such marriages." He concluded writing, "The comic interludes are horrendous and the romantic bits reprehensible" and criticized the performance of the cast. Shashiprasad S. M. of Deccan Chronicle rated the film 2/5 and wrote, "Regardless of the outcome, every frame the director has captured through his cinematographer looks like a beautiful painting worth preserving it with a frame." He concluded criticizing the film's "unsavory comedy" and further wrote, "[t]hough the director’s good intention looks good talking about the sensitive issue such as divorce and its repercussion on the child but unfortunately it does not feel good after more than hours of experience."

References

External links 
 
 

2016 films
Indian romantic drama films
2016 romantic drama films
2010s Kannada-language films
Films directed by Indrajit Lankesh